Sci Fi Universal in Slovenia was launched on October 1, 2009; specializing in science fiction, fantasy and horror shows and movies.

Programming

Current

Sliders
Stargate Universe
Stargate Atlantis
Eureka
Stargate SG-1
Ghost Hunters International
Futurama
Legend of the Seeker
Being Human
Warehouse 13
The X-Files

Movie Block

References

External links
Official Site

Syfy
Television channels in Slovenia
Television channels and stations established in 2009
Science fiction television channels
2009 establishments in Slovenia